is a national highway of Japan connecting Shingū, Wakayama and Hirakata, Osaka in Japan, with a total length of 194.8 km (121.04 mi).

References

National highways in Japan
Roads in Nara Prefecture
Roads in Osaka Prefecture
Roads in Wakayama Prefecture